The 1984 NCAA Division I men's ice hockey tournament was the culmination of the 1983–84 NCAA Division I men's ice hockey season, the 37th such tournament in NCAA history. It was held between March 16 and 24, 1984, and concluded with Bowling Green defeating Minnesota-Duluth 5-4 in quadruple overtime. All Quarterfinals matchups were held at home team venues, while all succeeding games were played at the 1980 Olympic Arena in Lake Placid, New York.

As of 2021 the final game is the longest match to determine a champion in NCAA history.

Qualifying teams
The NCAA permitted 8 teams to qualify for the tournament and divided its qualifiers into two regions (East and West). Each of the tournament champions from the three Division I conferences (CCHA, ECAC and WCHA) received automatic invitations into the tournament with At-large bids making up the remaining 5 teams, an additional 2 western and 3 eastern schools.

Format
The tournament featured three rounds of play. The two odd-number ranked teams from one region were placed into a bracket with the two even-number ranked teams of the other region. The teams were then seeded according to their ranking. In the Quarterfinals the first and fourth seeds and the second and third seeds played two-game aggregate series to determine which school advanced to the Semifinals. Beginning with the Semifinals all games were played at the 1980 Olympic Arena and all series became Single-game eliminations. The winning teams in the semifinals advanced to the National Championship Game with the losers playing in a Third Place game.

Tournament bracket

Note: * denotes overtime period(s)

Quarterfinals

(E1) Rensselaer vs. (W4) North Dakota

(E2) Boston University vs. (W3) Bowling Green

(W1) Michigan State vs. (E4) Boston College

(W2) Minnesota–Duluth vs. (E3) Clarkson

Semifinal

(W2) Minnesota–Duluth vs. (W4) North Dakota

(W1) Michigan State vs. (W3) Bowling Green

Third-place game

(W1) Michigan State vs. (W4) North Dakota

National Championship

(W2) Minnesota–Duluth vs. (W3) Bowling Green

All-Tournament team
G: Rick Kosti (Minnesota-Duluth)
G: Gary Kruzich* (Bowling Green)
D: David Ellett (Bowling Green)
D: Garry Galley (Bowling Green)
F: Dean Barsness (North Dakota)
F: Bob Lakso (Minnesota-Duluth)
F: Lyle Phair (Michigan State)
* Most Outstanding Player(s)

References

External links
NCAA Hockey: 1984 National Championship - Bowling Green vs. Minnesota-Duluth  - YouTube.com

Tournament
NCAA Division I men's ice hockey tournament
NCAA Division I Men's Ice Hockey Tournament
NCAA Division I Men's Ice Hockey Tournament
NCAA Division I Men's Ice Hockey Tournament
NCAA Division I Men's Ice Hockey Tournament
NCAA Division I Men's Ice Hockey Tournament
NCAA Division I Men's Ice Hockey Tournament
Ice hockey competitions in Minnesota
Ice hockey competitions in New York (state)
Ice hockey competitions in Boston
Sports competitions in Duluth, Minnesota
Ice hockey competitions in Michigan
Sports in Lake Placid, New York
East Lansing, Michigan
Troy, New York
Sports in Rensselaer County, New York